Peary Glacier, is a glacier in north west Greenland. Administratively it belongs to the Avannaata municipality.

This glacier was named after US Arctic explorer Robert Peary (1856 - 1920).

Geography 
The Peary Glacier is located in the Lauge Koch Coast, Melville Bay. It originates in the western Greenland ice sheet and flows southwestwards between the Rink Glacier to the northwest and the King Oscar Glacier to the southeast. Its terminus lies east of Cape Murdoch, northeast of the Balgoni Islands and Thalbitzer Næs in Melville Bay. Unlike the neighboring King Oscar Glacier, it does not produce many icebergs.

See also
List of glaciers in Greenland

References

External links
Glacier Photograph Collection - National Snow and Ice Data Center - Peary Glacier, Greenland

Glaciers of Greenland